The 1947 Lausanne Grand Prix was a non-championship Formula One motor race held in Lausanne on 5 October 1947. The race was held over 90 laps and was won by Luigi Villoresi in a Maserati 4CL. Jean-Pierre Wimille in a Simca Gordini Type 15 was second and Emmanuel de Graffenried in another Maserati 4CL was third. Alberto Ascari started from pole position in his Maserati 4CL and set fastest lap  but retired with brake failure.

Classification

References

Lausanne Grand Prix